Wildcat Den State Park is a state park of Iowa, US, in Muscatine County. The park features  cliffs, rock formations, and several historic structures. The 1848 Pine Creek Gristmill and Pine Mill Bridge are both on the National Register of Historic Places. The campground has 28 campsites, but lacks modern restroom facilities. There are also two open shelters that can be reserved for a fee through the park manager. Advance campsite reservations can be booked through the  park reservation system.

References

External links 
 Wildcat Den State Park
 Fairport State Recreation Area
 Wildcat Den State Park Documentary produced by Iowa Public Television

State parks of Iowa
Protected areas of Muscatine County, Iowa